Harsiotef was a Kushite King of Meroe (about 404 – 369 BC).

Harsiotef took on a full set of titles based on those of the Egyptian Pharaohs:

Horus name:  Kanakht Khaemnepet ("Mighty Bull appears in Napata")
Nebty Name: Nednetjeru ("Who seeks the council of Gods") 
Golden Horus Name: Uftikhesutnebut ("Subduer given all the Desert Lands") 
Prenomen: Sameryamun ("Beloved son of Amun")  
Nomen: Harsiotef ("Horus Son of his Father")

Harsiotef was the son of Queen Atasamale and likely of King Amanineteyerike. He had a wife named Queen Batahaliye and may have had another wife named Queen Pelkha. If Queen Pelkha was his wife, he would also be the father of King Nastasen. It is possible that King Akhraten was also a son of Harsiotef, and Queen Sakhmakh, the wife of Nastasen, may be his daughter.

He left an inscription dated to his thirty-third regnal year, listing the battles from his successful campaign east of his kingdom against a town called Habasa, whose inhabitants were called Matit. As a result of his victory, the Matit agreed to pay tribute to him. 

The name of this place may be the earliest recorded use of the word Habesha, the etymological basis for English Abyssinia. The only earlier text which may refer to the term is the mention of a "foreign people from the incense-producing regions" called ḫbstjw during Queen Hatshepsut's time, which scholars assume refers to the land of Punt and the Habesha.

Matit is recorded in the reigns of both Harsiotef and Nastasen. The people of Matit or Matata also fought against the Aksumite king Ezana centuries later.

Harsiotef was buried in a pyramid at Nuri (Nu. 13).

References

5th-century BC monarchs of Kush
4th-century BC monarchs of Kush
4th-century BC rulers